Matricaria chamomilla (synonym: Matricaria recutita), commonly known as chamomile (also spelled camomile), German chamomile, Hungarian chamomile (kamilla), wild chamomile, blue chamomile, or scented mayweed, is an annual plant of the composite family Asteraceae. Commonly, the name M. recutita is applied to the most popular source of the herbal product chamomile, although other species are also used as chamomile. Chamomile is known mostly for its use against gastrointestinal problems; additionally, it can be used to treat irritation of the skin.

Description

Matricaria chamomilla is a member of the Asteraceae family, native to southern and eastern Europe. The long and narrow leaves are bipinnate or tripinnate. The flowers are borne in paniculate flower heads (capitula). The white ray florets are furnished with a ligule, while the disc florets are yellow. The hollow receptacle is swollen and lacks scales. This property distinguishes German chamomile from corn chamomile (Anthemis arvensis), which has a receptacle with scales. The flowers bloom in early to midsummer and have a fragrant aroma.

The flowers contain a blue essential oil, which gives them a characteristic smell and interesting properties. This color characteristic of the oil, attributable to the chamazulene it contains, explains why the plant is also known by the common name blue chamomile. The fruit is a yellowish-brown achene.

Etymology
The word chamomile comes from the Greek χαμαίμηλον (chamaimēlon) meaning "earth-apple", which is derived from χαμαί (chamai) meaning "on the ground" and μήλον (mēlon) meaning "apple". It is so called because of the apple-like scent of the plant.

In Latin, one of the meanings of matrix is womb; the name Matricaria was given to the genus because Matricaria chamomilla was widely used to treat such gynecologic complaints as menstrual cramps and sleep disorders related to premenstrual syndrome. The plant has been found to contain fairly strong antispasmodic and anti-inflammatory constituents and is particularly effective in treating stomach and intestinal cramps.

History

Chamomile plants were used medicinally in Ancient Egypt and Classical Antiquity. Some Germanic tribes knew of it before they had a written language. It is difficult to tell exactly which plant species have been used.

Pliny the Elder identified three types of chamomile, which may align with the modern species names Matricaria chamomila, M. aurea, and Anthemis rosea.

Under Charlemagne, chamomile was grown in monastic gardens.

Uses

Traditional medicine
German chamomile is used in herbal medicine. It can be taken as an herbal tea.

Phytochemistry
More than 120 chemical constituents have been identified in chamomile flower, most of them found in the essential oil. Chemical constituents of the essential oil include: the terpenes bisabolol, farnesene, and chamazulene; the flavonoids apigenin, quercetin, patuletin, and luteolin; and coumarin.

Possible side effects
Chamomile, a relative of ragweed, can cause allergy symptoms and can cross-react with ragweed pollen in individuals with ragweed allergies. It also contains coumarin, so care should be taken to avoid potential drug interactions, e.g. with blood thinners.
While extremely rare, very large doses of chamomile may cause nausea and vomiting. Even more rarely, rashes may occur. Type-IV allergic reactions (i.e. contact dermatitis) are common and one case of severe Type-I reaction (i.e. anaphylaxis) has been reported in a 38-year-old man who drank chamomile tea.

Cultivation

Seeding requirements
Its origin is in South-West Asia, South- to Eastern Europe, but it grows almost all over the world nowadays.

For the cultivation of chamomile, the soil needs no special quality although the crop grows best on well balanced soils with good topsoil. Chamomile is an undemanding plant and pretty tolerant. The crop grows on light to heavy soils. The wild-growing chamomile species normally grow on sandy to loamy soils that are mostly acidic and should be open.

There exist three main cultivation techniques: seeding it as an annual crop in autumn, seeding it as an annual crop in spring or use it as a perennial crop, where the seeding is self-made. The most common method is a mixture of autumn and spring seeding to have a higher degree of utilization of the machines. As the Chamomile seeds are very small, a special sowing machine is used for the seeding. The seeding is normally done in rows of 25 cm (10") distance and about 2.0–2.5 kg/ha (approx. 2 lb per acre). The seedbed needs to be flat and weed-free and it also has to be recompressed after seeding. The recompression is very important why the soil has to be rolled with a heavy roll after seeding. Otherwise, the small seeds do not have contact with the soil which hampers germination. For its germination and its youth stage the chamomile plant needs a lot of moisture. After 1–2 weeks the germination starts.

If the seeding is done in autumn the perfect time is in September. Chamomile which is seeded in autumn generates the highest yields. No matter at what time in September the seeding was made, the blossom starts when the day length is about 17 hours, which is in Central Europe around the end of May or beginning of June.

By seeding in spring, the harvest time can be influenced, which helps to get a higher utilization degree of the machines due to prolonged periods of seeding and harvesting as well as other cultivation works. The seeding is done between March and May. But one can say that the yield is sinking with later seeding and the pest pressure is rising. The crop can be harvested around the 2nd half of July.

In a more extensive cultivation, the seeding is self-made by the plant and the cultivation is perennial. After the last harvest the plants are cut and left on the field. Afterward, the soil is mechanically treated but not turned. The seeds then germinate in September and create a carpet-like layer over the soil, which is very helpful against weeds. The yields are comparable to the ones of autumn sowings.

Fertilization
Chamomile is a humble plant that can grow on soils with mean nutrient status. It responds to fertilization with Nitrogen (N) with an increased vegetative growth what can lead to problems with the harvesting technique and the harvest time can be delayed. For a good development of the stem, adequate potassium (K) is needed. The optimal ratio of potassium to phosphorus (P) should be 1:2. This leads to an optimal fertilizer amount of:

40–60 kg/ha N
50–70 kg/ha P
100–140 kg/ha K

The N and K should be given in the time of tillering. A lack of micronutrients is not known so far. The chamomile plant grows best on well-balanced soil with good topsoil. However organic matter fertilizer should not be given during chamomile cropping for quality reasons. If there is a limit of bacterial contamination asked by the processing company, organic matter fertilizer is a risk for bacterial contamination of the flower and its resulting products. In other crops in the crop rotation e.g. before chamomile, fertilization with organic matter is highly recommended.

Pest and weed control
Chamomile has a slow youth development that requires good weed control. Before seeding it is important to have a proper seedbed without any weeds for which reason residual herbicides can be used. Due to the lack of existing selective herbicides, after germination only mechanical weed control is possible until the strong vegetative growth of the chamomile plant begins.

Aphids are a big threat for the chamomile production as they do not only lead to slower growth but also to an attraction of ladybugs. After having the flowers harvested, it is almost impossible to separate the insects from the flowers. This might lead to quality problems of the harvested chamomile depending on its purpose of use.

The most important pests that occur in the European production are downy mildew, powdery mildew and rust.

Crop rotation
Chamomile is known to be a self-compatible crop which means that a perennial cultivation is possible.
For Chamomile, the most important condition which has to be induced by the crop rotation is a weed-free seedbed. This is normally given after cultivation of row crops (e.g. Potato), wheat or corn. One big problem for the chamomile following crop are volunteer chamomile seeds. Due to the harvesting process a lot of seeds are left on the ground and germinate during the next crop. Therefore, it is crucial to have a following crop which is tolerant towards chamomile targeting herbicides.

Harvest

Time of flowering and harvest
The chamomile plant often flowers 2 to 3 times per year. This is taken into account by multiple harvests per year as well. The flowering period is about 50–65 days while the development of a flower takes about 20–25 days.

The harvest begins with full flowering. The choice of the right harvest date is crucial for the quality of the harvested produce. The most important quality feature is the content of essential oil in the inflorescence which increases continuously from the beginning of the flower formation and reaches its maximum when the ray florets are horizontally or already pointing slightly downwards. Due to that, the harvest is run out when a majority of flower heads have opened.

To the identification of the optimal harvest date, therefore, has to be paid a lot of attention and the date should be able to be identified objectively and accurately. For an optimal identification, equations to determine the flowering index have been developed. The following equation expresses the compromise between the increasing yield of flowers, the decreasing content of essential oil and the change of the composition of contents in the essential oil. In this equation, the ratio between the number of overblowing flowers minus the number of flower buds and the total number of flowers is determined.

The optimal date of harvest for chamomile is when the flowering index calculated with the above-described formula lies between −0,3 and −0,2 or about 50–70% of the existing plants are in full flowering.

Hand harvest
At hand harvesting flower buds are either plucked with the fingers or simple technical devices as for example pluck combs, comb shovels or pluck carts are used. These methods are mostly deployed in small-scale cultivation or for the harvest of uncultivated chamomile. In today's agricultural growing systems harvest often takes place mechanically.

Mechanical harvest
Despite the mechanical harvesting techniques, it is crucial that the harvested produce is of high quality. According to that, requirements in regard to harvesting technology for careful handling of the harvested produce are high. To be able to implement and to improve mechanical harvest farmers should grow varieties with big flower heads which have a uniform plant height so that the flower buds are located on the same level.

At mechanical harvest there are never flower buds harvested only but also parts of stalks. These stalks are mostly in between 10mm and 30mm (½" to 1") long. In principle this has no influence on the quality of the harvested flower buds which will be used for pharmaceutical purposes but might cause some more effort needed for selection.

An important technical harvest principle is the one which is implemented by rotary-mowers, choppers or complete harvesters. In these cases, the whole flower horizon gets harvested. Especially for the harvest of chamomile either for tea production or industrial processing choppers are used.

One further very important harvest principle is the one where drums with sharp plucking combs rotate contrary to the direction of harvesting. Thereby the plant stock gets combed from bottom to top. Due to the added knives behind the plucking combs the flower buds get cut off and not torn off the plant stalk as this is the case for other common mechanical harvest technologies.

Yield level
The flowers contain between 0.3 and 1.5% of essential chamomile oil.

Post harvest treatment and further processing
An adequate post-harvest treatment of harvested chamomile parts is crucial for the preservation of excellent external and internal qualities.

Drying
The harvested produce contains about 80% of water therefore it is at risk of fermentation. To ensure the storability, the product has to be dried down to a water content of only 10–11%. The process of drying should not start more than 2 hours after harvesting due to the higher risk of fermentation compared to other crops. It is necessary to ensure that the storage height is not too big in order to avoid high pressure on the product and to not raise the risk of fermentation even more.

There are several drying systems as for example the natural drying in the sun or under a roof but also drying by discontinuous dryers, semi-continuous rack-dryers or continuous belt dryers. In any case the most important is that the product never gets heated up beyond 40 °C (104 °F).

Selection
By reason of mechanical harvest, the share of stalks on the harvested produce is higher. Therefor a sorting out oftentimes takes place immediately before the drying procedure. This process of selection is commonly carried out by double-walled counter-rotating drum screens. If necessary, in a further work process after drying the short parts of stalks on the flower buds will be detached to receive plain flower bud goods.

In the case of hand harvest the selection process oftentimes happens after the drying process.

Distillation
An important reason for the production of chamomile blossoms is the extraction of chamomile oil which is used for pharmaceutical purposes. This oil is extracted by distillation mostly out of fresh flower buds and flower stalks. An important ingredient of the chamomile oil is bisabolol which accounts for up to 33% of the content of the oil.

See also
 Asteraceae
 Chamaemelum nobile (Roman chamomile)
 Chamomile
 Matricin

References

Further reading

External links
USDA

Matricaria
Medicinal plants
Herbal tea
Plants described in 1753
Taxa named by Carl Linnaeus
Flora of Europe
Flora of temperate Asia